Sherif Fawzy (born 2 June 1990) is an Egyptian footballer who plays as a goalkeeper for Egyptian Premier League club Zamalek.

References

1989 births
Living people
Egyptian footballers
Association football goalkeepers
Zamalek SC players
People from Damietta